Mulberry is an unincorporated community in Chilton County, Alabama, United States.

Notes

Unincorporated communities in Chilton County, Alabama
Unincorporated communities in Alabama